Zaslavsky Uyezd (Заславский уезд) was one of the subdivisions of the Volhynian Governorate of the Russian Empire. It was situated in the southern part of the governorate. Its administrative centre was Iziaslav.

Demographics
At the time of the Russian Empire Census of 1897, Zaslavsky Uyezd had a population of 208,742. Of these, 76.9% spoke Ukrainian, 13.3% Yiddish, 7.0% Polish, 1.8% Russian, 0.8% German and 0.2% Czech as their native language.

References

 
Uezds of Volhynian Governorate
Volhynian Governorate